Antoinette Asselineau (May 15, 1811 – January 1, 1889) was a French painter born in Hamburg, Germany.

Biography 

A portrait and scenic painter, Antoinette Asselineau was the sister of painter and lithographer Léon Auguste Asselineau.

Collections 

 Town hall of Bayon, France, Le roi Louis-Philippe, 1842, oil on canvas
 musée national du château de Fontainebleau
 Rouen, Musée national de l'Éducation
 Versailles, musée national des châteaux de Versailles et de Trianon : L'intérieur du théâtre de la reine au Petit Trianon en 1838, Salon, de 1838, oil on canvas.

References 

1811 births
1889 deaths
19th-century French women artists
19th-century French painters
French portrait painters